Yangambi Airport is a small airport serving the town of Yangambi, Democratic Republic of the Congo.

References

Airports in Tshopo